The Anglican Diocese of Egba  West is one of 13 within the Anglican Province of Lagos, itself one of 14 provinces within the Church of Nigeria. The current bishop is Samuel Oludele Ogundeji. The diocese was erected from the Diocese of Egba and inaugurated on 22 April 2007.

References

Dioceses of the Province of Lagos
 
Egba West